Maxwell Holmes Smethurst (6 December 1914 – 22 November 1991) was an  Australian rules footballer who played with Hawthorn in the Victorian Football League (VFL).

Notes

External links 

1914 births
1991 deaths
Australian rules footballers from Victoria (Australia)
Hawthorn Football Club players